WDJC-FM (93.7 FM) is a radio station licensed to Birmingham, Alabama.  The station was one of the first commercial FM radio stations in the United States to exclusively feature Christian programming.  Today the station programs contemporary Christian music.  Owned by Crawford Broadcasting Company, WDJC-FM's transmitter tower is in Southwest Birmingham, and its studios are located in Homewood.

History

WSGN-FM
The initial occupant of the 93.7 frequency in Birmingham was WSGN-FM. The station signed on in 1947; it was originally owned by the parent company of The Birmingham News, and it was the sister station of one of the more popular AM radio stations in Birmingham.  In 1953, the parent company of The News purchased WAFM-TV, WAPI and WAFM-FM and was forced to sell WSGN-AM and FM to Jemison Broadcasting Company and then to Winston-Salem Broadcasting Company. Because FM radio was in its infancy, and as such neither popular nor profitable, the station was shut down in 1955.

WSFM

On a new license, James Melonas built a new station at 93.7 FM in 1958. This station bore the call letters WSFM and featured a classical music format.

In 1967, Melonas, who struggled through most of his ownership to get advertisers to sponsor classical music programming, sold the frequency to Crawford Broadcasting Company.  With its new call letters, WDJC, the station changed formats and began broadcasting Christian programming.  Initially, the programming consisted of Bible studies, church services and other Christian teaching; by the mid-1970s, some contemporary Christian music was added to the programming mix (it is believed that only Huntsville's now-defunct WNDA—now WRTT-FM—was the only other station in the state to do so at the time).  At about the same time, a nightly program featuring Southern gospel music, the Dixie Gospel Caravan, was added.  This programming strategy continued well into the 1990s.

After an AM sister station was named WDJC, this station was assigned the WDJC-FM call letters by the Federal Communications Commission on December 4, 1978. On December 1, 1981, the station resumed its former WDJC call letters.  The station was reassigned the current WDJC-FM call letters by the Federal Communications Commission on June 3, 1994.

In 1998, WDJC-FM dropped the non-music elements of its programming.  WFMH-FM in Cullman was purchased by a group of Birmingham investors with the purpose of launching a station that would play contemporary Christian music 24 hours a day, seven days a week.  Initially, the new station, rebranded as WRRS-FM proved to be a challenger to WDJC-FM; in reaction to the challenge, WDJC-FM began to play contemporary Christian music exclusively.  Within three years, WRRS changed formats; ironically, Crawford Broadcasting bought the competing station in 2003 and changed its format to talk radio.

WDJC-FMHD3 carried "99.1 The Game" (NBC Sports Radio) until November 10, 2017, also via W256CD, which is now carrying WQEN-HD3/WDXB-HD2 Alt 99.1 since November 12, 2017.

References

External links
WDJC official website

DJC-FM
Contemporary Christian radio stations in the United States
Radio stations established in 1958
DJC-FM
1958 establishments in Alabama